Erzsébet Kútvölgyi (born November 14, 1950) is a Jászai Mari Award and Kossuth Prize-winning Hungarian actress.

Filmography
Misi mókus kalandjai as Sammy the Squirrel
Macbeth
Johnny Corncob as the Princess
The Little Fox as fox girl

References

External links

1950 births
Living people
20th-century Hungarian actresses
Actresses from Budapest
Hungarian stage actresses
Hungarian television actresses
Hungarian film actresses
Hungarian voice actresses